Participatory democracy, participant democracy or participative democracy is a form of government in which citizens participate individually and directly in political decisions and policies that affect their lives, rather than through elected representatives. Elements of direct and representative democracy are combined in this model.

Overview 
Participatory democracy is a type of democracy, which is itself a form of government. The term "democracy" is derived from the Greek expression  (dēmokratia) (δῆμος/dēmos: people, Κράτος/kratos: rule). It has two main subtypes, direct and representative democracy. In the former, the people have the authority to deliberate and decide legislation; in the latter, they choose governing officials to do so. While direct democracy was the original concept, its representative version is the most widespread today.

Public participation, in this context, is the inclusion of the public in the activities of a polity. It can be any process that directly engages the public in decision-making and gives consideration to its input. The extent to which political participation should be considered necessary or appropriate is under debate in political philosophy.

Participatory democracy is primarily concerned with ensuring that citizens have the opportunity to be involved in decision-making on matters that affect their lives. It is not a new concept and has existed in various forms since the Athenian democracy. Its modern theory was developed by Jean-Jacques Rousseau in the 18th century and later promoted by John Stuart Mill and G. D. H. Cole, who argued that political participation is indispensable for a just society. In the early 21st century, participatory democracy has been more widely studied and experimented with, leading to various institutional reform ideas such as participatory budgeting.

History

Origins in Ancient Greece 

Democracy in general first appeared in the city-state of Athens during classical antiquity. It was first established under Cleisthenes in 508–507 BC. This was a direct democracy, in which ordinary citizens were randomly selected to fill government administrative and judicial offices, and there was a legislative assembly consisting of all Athenian citizens. However, Athenian citizenship excluded women, slaves, foreigners (μέτοικοι/métoikoi) and youths below the age of military service. Athenian democracy was the most direct in history as the people controlled the entire political process through the assembly, the boule and the courts, and a large proportion of citizens were involved constantly in public matters.

During the 19th and 20th centuries

The Paris Commune and its influences 
In the late 19th century a small number of thinkers, including Karl Marx, Friedrich Engels, Mikhail Bakunin and Oscar Wilde began advocating for participatory democracy. Marx and Engels in particular were influenced by the short-lived social democracy the French revolutionary government known as the Paris Commune introduced in 1871. During the 20th century, practical implementations began to take place, mostly on a small scale, attracting considerable academic attention in the 1980s.

During the Spanish Civil War 
During the Spanish Civil War (1936–1939) the parts of Spain controlled by anarchist members of the Republican faction were governed almost completely by participatory democracy. The philosopher Simone Weil, who had been a soldier on the side of the anarchists, later wrote a political manifesto titled The Need for Roots promoting participatory democracy.

In the United States during the second half of the 20th century 
In the 1960s, US national student activist organisation Students for a Democratic Society (SDS) was organised around the principles of participatory democracy. In the 1980s, participatory democracy became more widely researched, first by Professor James S. Fishkin, who also introduced the concept of the deliberative opinion poll.

In 1996, the Texas government commissioned a deliberative opinion poll to gage citizens' willingness to pursue alternative sources of energy. First, a raw opinion poll was taken, then a representative sample of citizens was provided with briefing books and invited to deliberate with moderating. Following a weekend of deliberation, the participants developed opinions that significantly diverged from their ones: beforehand, 52% of participants supported a $2–5 increase on monthly invoices in exchange for renewable energy. By the end of the experiment, support increased to 84%. The results of the poll heavily influenced the actions of the Texan government and electric power industry. While in 1996, the state was only the 49th largest producer of renewable energy in the United States, as of 2021, it leads the country in the production of wind power.

Other international experiments 
Other experiments in participatory democracy took place in various cities around the world. As one of the earliest examples, Porto Alegre, Brazil adapted a system of participatory budgeting in 1989. A World Bank study found that participatory democracy in these cities seemed to result in considerable improvement in the quality of life for residents.

In the 21st century 
In the early 21st century, experiments in participatory democracy began to spread throughout South and North America, China, and across the European Union. In a US example, the plans to rebuild New Orleans after Hurricane Katrina in 2005 were drafted and approved by thousands of ordinary citizens.

Citizens' conventions 
In the 2010s, systems of participatory democracy have become more frequent with multiple governments around the world commissioning "citizens' conventions" to address specific issues. Participants were typically chosen through sortition with stratified sampling to make the body more representative. Conventions were divided into groups to explore specific topics in greater depth, guided by testimonies of experts. Deliberation was led by professional facilitators and legal experts helped with the formulation of proposals. Reports of such conventions were often put to a referendum or used to advise government bodies.

The Constitutional Convention (2012) and the Citizens' Assembly (2015-2016) in Ireland 
In 2011, as a response to citizens' growing distrust in the government following the financial crisis of 2007–2008, Ireland authorised a citizens' assembly called "We the Citizens". Its task was to pilot the use of a participatory democratic body and test whether it could increase political legitimacy. There was an increase in both efficacy and interest in governmental functions, as well as significant opinion shifts on contested issues like taxation.  In 2012, Ireland held a Constitutional Convention ("An Coinbhinsiún ar an mBunreach") to discuss proposed amendments to its constitution. It used a hybrid model, meaning that participants included 66 regular citizens, 33 legislators from the Irish Parliament, and chairman Tom Arnold, an economist. After 14 months of work, several of the citizens' recommendations were put to referendums. In 2015, Thirty-fourth Amendment of the Constitution of Ireland, the Marriage Equality Act, was added after a referendum, and success was attributed to the 2012 Constitutional Convention.

Next was the Citizens' Assembly ("An Tionól Saoránach") in 2015–2016, composed of 99 ordinary citizens and one government-appointed chairperson. Among other issues, it considered whether the Eighth Amendment, which banned abortion in nearly all instances, should be removed from the constitution. Debate occurred over a 5 month period and a secret ballot was held at the end with members voting to replace the amendment with a provision that authorised the parliament to legislate abortion. In a following countrywide referendum, 66% voted to repeal the amendment. The close alignment of the percentages of the assembly's ballot and the popular referendum suggested that it had been a representative body.

The Citizens Convention for Climate in France (2019) 
The French government organised "le grand débat national" (the Great National Debate) in early 2019 as a response to the Yellow vests movement. It consisted of 18 regional conventions, each with 100 randomly selected citizens, that had to deliberate on issues they valued the most so that they could influence government action. After the debate, a citizens' convention was created specifically to discuss climate change, "la Convention citoyenne pour le climat" (the Citizens Convention for Climate, CCC), designed to serve as a legislative body to decide how the country could reduce its greenhouse gas emissions with social justice in mind. It consisted of 150 citizens selected by sortition and stratified sampling, who were sorted into five sub-groups to discuss individual topics. The members were helped by experts on steering committees. The proceedings of the CCC garnered international attention. After 9 months, the convention outlined 149 measures in a 460-page report, and President Macron committed to supporting 146 of them. A bill containing these was submitted to the parliament in late 2020.

The UK Climate Assembly (2020) 
The UK held the UK Climate Assembly in 2020 to discuss climate change following the Extinction Rebellion. The framing question asked how the UK should approach reaching net zero greenhouse gas emissions by 2050. Rather than functioning as a legislative body (as the CCC in France) it was more of an advisory body with stricter rules of engagement. In it, 108 citizens deliberated for over four months, resulting in more than 50 recommendations outlined in a 556-page report, which advised the government's next steps in mitigating climate change.

Effects of social media 
In recent years, social media has led to changes in the conduct of participatory democracy. Citizens with differing points of view are able to join conversations, mainly through the use of hashtags. To promote public interest and involvement, local governments have started using social media to make decisions based on public feedback. Users have also organised online committees to highlight local needs and appoint budget delegates who work with the citizens and city agencies.

The Occupy movement 
Participatory democracy was a notable feature of the Occupy movement in 2011. "Occupy camps" around the world made decisions based on the outcome of working groups where every protester had a say. These decisions were then aggregated by general assemblies. This process combined equality, mass participation, and deliberation.

Evaluation

Strengths 

The most prominent argument for participatory democracy is its function of greater democratization.

With participatory democracy, individuals or groups can realistically achieve their interests, "[providing] the means to a more just and rewarding society, not a strategy for preserving the status quo."

Participatory democracy may also have an educational effect. Greater political participation can lead to the public to seeking to also make it higher quality in efficacy and depth: "the more individuals participate the better able they become to do so", an idea already promoted by Rousseau, Mill, and Cole. Pateman emphasises this potential as it counteracts the widespread lack of faith in the capacity and capability of citizens to meaningfully participate, especially in societies with complex organisations. Joel D. Wolfe asserts his confidence that such models could be implemented even in large organizations, progressively diminishing state intervention.

Weaknesses 
Criticisms of participatory democracy generally align with advocacy for minimal democracy. The main opposition is the disbelief in citizens' capabilities to bear the greater responsibility. Some reject the feasibility of participatory models and refutes its proposed educational benefits.

Critics conclude that the citizenry is disinterested and leader-dependent, making the mechanism for participatory democracy inherently incompatible with advanced societies.

Other concerns are whether such massive political input can be managed and turned into effective output. David Plotke highlights that the institutional adjustments needed to make greater political participation possible would require a representative element. Consequently, both direct and participatory democracy must rely on some type of representation to sustain a stable system. He also states that achieving equal direct participation in large and heavily populated regions is hardly possible, and ultimately argues in favor of representation over participation, calling for a hybrid between participatory and representative models.

A third category of criticism, primarily advanced by Dr. Roslyn Fuller, rejects equating or even subsuming instruments of Deliberative Democracy (such as citizens’ assemblies) under the term of Participatory Democracy, as such instruments violate the hard-won concept of political equality (One Man, One Vote), in exchange for a small chance of being randomly selected to participate and are thus not ‘participatory’ in any meaningful sense.

Proponents of Deliberative Democracy in her view misconstrue the role sortition played in the ancient Athenian democracy (where random selection was limited only to offices and positions with very limited power whereas participation in the main decision-making forum was open to all citizens).

Dr. Fuller's most serious criticism is that Deliberative Democracy purposefully limits decisions to small, externally controllable groups while ignoring the plethora of e-democracy tools available which allow for unfiltered mass participation and deliberation.

Mechanisms promoting participatory democracy 
Scholars have recently proposed several mechanisms to increase citizen participation in democratic systems. These methods intend to increase the agenda-setting and decision-making powers of the people by giving citizens more direct ways to contribute to politics.

Citizens' assemblies 

Also called mini-publics, citizens' assemblies are representative samples of a population that meet to create legislation or advise legislative bodies. As citizens are chosen to participate by stratified sampling, the assemblies are more representative of the population than elected legislatures whose representatives are often disproportionally wealthy, male, and white. Assemblies chosen by sortition provide average citizens with the opportunity to exercise substantive agenda-setting and/or decision-making power. Over the course of the assembly, citizens are helped by experts and discussion facilitators, and the results are either put to a referendum or sent in a report to the government.

Critics of citizens' assemblies have raised concerns about their perceived legitimacy. Political scientist Daan Jacobs finds that although the perceived legitimacy of assemblies is higher than that of system with no participation, but not any higher than that of any system involving self-selection. Regardless, the use of citizens' assemblies has grown throughout the early 21st century and they have were often used in constitutional reforms, such as in British Columbia's Citizens' Assembly on Electoral Reform in 2004 and the Irish Constitutional Convention in 2012.

Deliberative opinion polls 

 Trademarked by Stanford professor James S. Fishkin, deliberative opinion polls allow citizens to develop informed opinions before voting through deliberation. Deliberative polling begins with surveying a random representative sample of citizens to gage their opinion. The same individuals are then invited to deliberate for a weekend in the presence of political leaders, experts, and moderators. At the end, the group is surveyed again, and the final opinions are taken to be the conclusion the public would have reached if they had the opportunity to engage with the issue more deeply. Philosopher Cristina Lafont, a critic of deliberative opinion polling argues that the "filtered" (informed) opinion reached at the end of a poll is too far removed from the opinion of the citizenry, delegitimizing the actions based on them.

E-democracy 

E-democracy is an umbrella term describing a variety of proposals to increase participation through technology. Open discussion forums provide citizens the opportunity to debate policy online while facilitators guide discussion. These forums usually serve agenda-setting purposes or are sometimes used to provide legislators with additional testimony. Closed forums may be used to discuss more sensitive information: in the United Kingdom, one was used to enable domestic violence survivors to testify to the All-Party Parliamentary Group on Domestic Violence and Abuse while preserving their anonymity.

Another e-democratic mechanism is online deliberative polling, a system in which citizens deliberate with peers virtually before answering a poll. The results of deliberative opinion polls are more likely to reflect the considered judgments of the people and encourage increased citizen awareness of civic issues.

Liquid democracy 

In a hybrid between direct and representative democracy, liquid democracy permits individuals to either vote on issues themselves or to select issue-competent delegates to vote on their behalf. Political scientists Christian Blum and Christina Isabel Zuber suggest that liquid democracy has the potential to improve a legislature's performance through bringing together delegates with a greater awareness on a specific issue, taking advantage of knowledge within the population. To make liquid democracy more deliberative, a trustee model of delegation may be implemented, in which the delegates vote after deliberation with other representatives.

Some concerns have been raised about the implementation of liquid democracy. Blum and Zuber, for example, find that it produces two classes of voters: individuals with one vote and delegates with two or more. They also worry that policies produced in issue-specific legislatures will lack cohesiveness. Liquid democracy is utilized by Pirate Parties for intra-party decision-making.

Participatory budgeting 

Participatory budgeting allows citizens to make decisions on the allocation of a public budget. Originating in Porto Alegre, Brazil, the general procedure involves the creation of a concrete financial plan that then serves as a recommendation to elected representatives. Neighbourhoods are given the authority to design budgets for the greater region and local proposals are brought to elected regional forums. This system lead to a decrease in clientelism and corruption and an increase in participation, particularly amongst marginalized and poorer residents. Theorist Graham Smith observes that participatory budgeting still has some barriers to entry for the poorest members of the population.

Referendums 

In binding referendums, citizens vote on laws and/or constitutional amendments proposed by a legislative body. Referendums afford citizens greater decision-making power by giving them the ultimate decision, and they may also use referendums for agenda-setting if they are allowed to draft proposals to be put to referendums in efforts called popular initiatives. Compulsory voting can further increase participation. Political theorist Hélène Landemore raises the concern that referendums may fail to be sufficiently deliberative as people are unable to engage in discussions and debates that would enhance their decision-making abilities.

Switzerland currently uses a rigorous system of referendums, under which all laws the legislature proposes go to referendums. Swiss citizens may also start popular initiatives, a process in which citizens put forward a constitutional amendment or propose the removal of an existing provision. Any proposal must receive the signature of 100,000 citizens to go to a ballot.

Town meetings 

In local participatory democracy, town meetings provide all residents with legislative power. Practiced in the United States, particularly in New England, since the 17th century, they assure that local policy decisions are made directly by the public. Local democracy is often seen as the first step towards a participatory system. Theorist Graham Smith, however, notes the limited impact of town meetings that cannot lead to action on national issues. He also suggests that town meetings are not representative as they disproportionately represent individuals with free time, including the elderly and the affluent.

Mechanisms to prevent participatory democracy 

In his 2016 book Against Democracy, Jason Brennan advocates for a less participatory system because of the irrationality of voters in a representative democracy. He proposes several mechanisms to reduce participation, presented with the assumption that a vote-based system of electoral representation is maintained.

Restricted suffrage and plural voting 

Comparing an untested voter to an unlicensed driver, Brennan argues that exams should be administered to all citizens to determine if they are competent to participate in public matters. Under this system, citizens either have one or zero votes, depending on their test performance. He also proposes a plural voting regime in which each citizen has by default one vote (or zero votes) but can earn additional votes through passing voter entrance exams or possessing academic degrees. Critics of Brennan, including reporter Sean Illing, found parallels between his proposed system and the literacy tests the Jim Crow laws that prevented black people from voting in the United States between.

Universal suffrage with epistocratic veto 

Brennan proposes a second system in which all citizens have equal rights to vote or otherwise participate in government, but decisions made by the elected representatives are scrutinized by an epistocratic council. This council could not make law, only "unmake" it, and would likely be composed of individuals who pass rigorous competency exams. He admits that an epistocratic veto could lead to significant gridlock but suggests that this may be a necessary evil in the process of reducing democratic incompetence. The epistocratic veto would thus serve as a back-end check, as opposed to a front-end check in restricted suffrage, that still allows all citizens to participate in electing representatives.

See also

 Civic intelligence
 Collaborative governance
 E-participation
 E-democracy
 Deliberative democracy
 Collaborative e-democracy
 Demarchy
 Direct democracy
 Green politics
 Inclusive Democracy
 Open source governance
 Participatory budgeting
 Participatory democracy in the European Union
 Participatory economics
 Participatory justice
 Public incubator
 Public sphere
 Public participation
 Radical transparency
 Rationality and power
 Sociocracy
 Socialism of the 21st century
 Tax choice
 The 23 objectives of the Australian Democrats
 The participatory approach
 Third International Theory
 Workers' council

Notes

References

Further reading

 
Articles containing video clips
Types of democracy